The Quander Airpfeil is a German ultralight trike that was designed and produced by UL Flugzeugbau Quander of Petershagen. The aircraft is supplied complete and ready to fly.

Design and development
It features a cable-braced hang glider-style high wing, weight-shift controls, a two-seats-in-tandem open cockpit without a cockpit fairing, tricycle landing gear and a single engine in pusher configuration.

The aircraft is made from bolted-together aluminum tubing, with its double surface Vento  wing covered in Dacron sailcloth. The  span wing is supported by a single tube-type kingpost and uses an "A" frame weight-shift control bar. The wing is supported by a three-tube tetrahedral structure, which is no longer common on modern trikes, but provides good strength at light weight. The powerplant is a twin-cylinder, liquid-cooled, two-stroke, dual-ignition  Rotax 582 engine.

Specifications (Airpfeil with Vento 13 wing)

References

External links

Archives of the Quander website on Archive.org

2000s German sport aircraft
2000s German ultralight aircraft
Homebuilt aircraft
Single-engined pusher aircraft
Ultralight trikes